Taipei City Constituency IV includes all of Neihu and Nangang in eastern Taipei. The district was created in 2008, when all local constituencies of the Legislative Yuan were reorganized to become single-member districts.

Current district
 Neihu
 Nangang

Legislators

Election results

2016

2015 Recall Alex Tsai Election

2012

2008

References 

Constituencies in Taipei